Elisenvaara is a settlement in Lakhdenpokhsky District of the Republic of Karelia, Russia, and an important station of the Viipuri-Joensuu railroad. The station is also linked by railway to Savonlinna, Finland. The settlement has an approximate population of 686 people.

The settlement grew around the railroad junction, with railroad connections to Viipuri, Sortavala, Lappeenranta and Savonlinna. In 1940, in the Moscow Armistice, Finnish Karelia, along with the Saint Petersburg-Sortavala railroad, was ceded to the Soviet Union. Connections to Lappeenranta and Savonlinna were cut.

The bombing of the Elisenvaara railway station on 20 June 1944, during the final stages of the Continuation War, was the most fatal bombing in Finnish history; over a hundred civilians were killed when the Soviet air bombs hit a train of Karelian evacuees.

References 

Rural localities in the Republic of Karelia
Lakhdenpokhsky District

Former urban-type settlements of Karelia